Anderson Ferreira da Silva (born 23 August 1995), commonly known as Pará, is a Brazilian footballer who plays for Vegalta Sendai as a left back.

Club career
Born in Capanema, Pará started his career at Remo as a forward, but due to his low height he later moved to the left back position, before joining Bahia. He made his debut with the latter's first team on 2 February 2014, featuring the last ten minutes in a 1–2 away loss against Santa Cruz for that year's Copa do Nordeste.

Pará made his Série A debut on 20 April, starting in a 1–2 home loss against Cruzeiro. He scored his first goal in the competition on 11 May, netting his team's only in a 1–1 home draw against fierce rivals Vitória.

On 28 January 2015 Pará moved to fellow league team Cruzeiro, signing a four-year deal and with Raposa buying 50% of his rights for R$500,000 fee.

References

External links
Cruzeiro official profile 

1995 births
Living people
Sportspeople from Pará
Brazilian footballers
Association football defenders
Campeonato Brasileiro Série A players
Campeonato Brasileiro Série B players
Esporte Clube Bahia players
Cruzeiro Esporte Clube players
Club Athletico Paranaense players
Figueirense FC players
América Futebol Clube (MG) players
Guarani FC players
Botafogo Futebol Clube (SP) players
Brazil under-20 international footballers
J1 League players
Vegalta Sendai players